The 2017–18 Copa Catalunya is the 29th staging of the Copa Catalunya. The competition will begin on 30 July 2017 and will be played by teams in Segunda División, Segunda División B, Tercera División and the top teams of Primera Catalana.

Qualified teams
The following teams compete in the 2017–18 Copa Catalunya.

3 teams of 2016–17 Segunda División

Gimnàstic
Girona
Reus

10 teams of 2016–17 Segunda División B

Badalona
Barcelona B
Cornellà
Espanyol B
Gavà
L'Hospitalet
Llagostera
Lleida Esportiu
Prat
Sabadell

17 teams of 2016–17 Tercera División

Ascó
Castelldefels
Cerdanyola
Europa
Figueres
Granollers
Júpiter
La Jonquera
Manlleu
Montañesa
Olot
Palamós
Sant Andreu
Santfeliuenc
Terrassa
Vilafranca
Vilassar de Mar

2 teams of 2016–17 Primera Catalana

Horta
Santboià

Tournament

First round

Matches were played on 29 and 30 July 2017.

Bye: Gimnàstic, Girona, Reus, Gavà

Second round

Matches were played on 5, 6, 9 and 10 August 2017.

Bye: Gimnàstic, Girona, Reus, Llagostera

Third round

Matches were played on 12 and 13 August 2017.

Bye: Gimnàstic, Girona, Reus

Fourth round

Matches played on 19 and 25 October 2017.

Bye: Horta

Semi-finals

Matches were played on 15 and 22 November 2017.

Final

External links
Federació Catalana de Futbol 

Cata
Copa Catalunya seasons
Copa